Norwegian County Road 405 (Fv405) is a Norwegian county road which runs between from the village of Engesland in Birkenes municipality in Agder county in the north to the junction with the Norwegian National Road 9 in the village of Mosby in Kristiansand municipality in the south. Prior to a 2010 government reform, the road was classified as a Norwegian national road.

References

405
Road transport in Agder
Birkenes
Iveland
Vennesla